Chicxulub  may refer to:

 Chicxulub crater, on the Yucatán Peninsula, in Mexico
 Chicxulub Pueblo, a town on the Yucatán Peninsula
 Chicxulub Pueblo Municipality, which includes the town
 Chicxulub Puerto, a coastal village in Progreso Municipality, Yucatán